Rosamond Joscelyne Mitchell (1902-1963) was an English historian, writer and archivist.

She won the Royal Historical Society's Alexander Medal in 1936, and in 1938 won the British Archaeological Association's Reginald Taylor Prize. Roberto Weiss cited her in his book Humanism in England during the Fifteenth Century and she cited him in her book John Free, From Bristol to Rome in the Fifteenth Century. After marrying Mr J. A. Leys "she chose not to seek an academic post".

Bibliography
 English People of the Past, with M. J. Whicher (Longmans Green, 1931)
 Life and Adventure in Medieval Europe (Longmans Green, 1934)
 Ye Good Olde Dayes, with Ierne L. Plunket (Methuen, 1934)
 John Tiptoft, 1427–1470 (Longmans Green, 1938)
 A History of the English People, with M. D. R. Leys (Longmans Green, 1950)
 John Free, from Bristol to Rome in the fifteenth century (Longmans Green, 1955)
 A History of London Life, with M. D. R. Leys (Longmans Green, 1958)
 The Medieval Feast (Longmans Green, 1958)
 The Medieval Tournament (Longmans Green, 1958)
 A Country Doctor in the Days of Queen Anne (Longmans Green, 1959)
 The Laurels and the Tiara: Pope Pius II, 1458–1464 (Harvill Press, 1962) 
 The Spring Voyage: The Jerusalem Pilgrimage in 1458 (John Murray, 1964)

References

External links
 C. H. Clough: 'In memory of Rosamund Joscelyne Mitchell', Italian Studies, 21 (1966), pp. 101–102. Abstract states: An appreciation of the work of the late Miss R. J. Mitchell (Mrs. A. Leys) has appeared in the 1964 issue of Italian Studies, 19 (1964), p. 94.
 Probate Office: Index to Wills. LEYS, Rosamond Joscelyne, of The Leys, Ware Lane, Lyme Regis, Dorset (wife of John Alan Leys) died 19 November 1963 at Broad Hinton, Wiltshire. Probate Exeter 25 February 1964 to Lloyds Bank Limited. £32905.

1902 births
Year of death missing
British women historians
English archivists
English historians
English women non-fiction writers
Female archivists